Ponderosa Pines is a census-designated place (CDP) in Gallatin County, Montana, United States. The population was 336 at the 2010 census. Formerly a 13,000-acre ranch, the land was subdivided into 10- and 20-acre parcels and sold by a Hawaiian real estate agency starting in 1972. The lots lacked water, sewer, electricity and road access, and some were on such steep terrain that building would be impossible.

Demographics

References

Census-designated places in Gallatin County, Montana
Census-designated places in Montana